Parapteroceras is a genus of flowering plants from the orchid family, Orchidaceae. It is found across much of Southeast Asia as well as in southern China, New Guinea, Queensland, and some islands of the Pacific Ocean.

Parapteroceras carnosum (Seidenf.) Aver. - Thailand
Parapteroceras elobe (Seidenf.) Aver. - Thailand, Vietnam, Hainan, Yunnan 
Parapteroceras erosulum (J.J.Sm.) J.J.Wood - Lombok
Parapteroceras escritorii (Ames) J.J.Wood - Philippines
Parapteroceras odoratissimum (J.J.Sm.) J.J.Wood - Java, Sumatra
Parapteroceras papuanum (Schltr.) Szlach. - Queensland, New Guinea, Solomons, Fiji, Niue, New Caledonia, Vanuatu, Cook Islands, Society Islands, Tubuai 
Parapteroceras quisumbingii (L.O.Williams) J.J.Wood - Luzon
Parapteroceras speciosum (D.L.Jones & al.) Szlach. - Papua New Guinea, Queensland

See also 
 List of Orchidaceae genera

References 

 Berg Pana, H. 2005. Handbuch der Orchideen-Namen. Dictionary of Orchid Names. Dizionario dei nomi delle orchidee. Ulmer, Stuttgart

External links 
 

Vandeae genera
Aeridinae